Mansoor Ali (born 12 January 2001) is a Pakistani cricketer. He made his first-class debut for Zarai Taraqiati Bank Limited in the 2018–19 Quaid-e-Azam Trophy on 25 September 2018. He made his List A debut for Zarai Taraqiati Bank Limited in the 2018–19 Quaid-e-Azam One Day Cup on 24 October 2018.

References

External links
 

2001 births
Living people
Pakistani cricketers
Zarai Taraqiati Bank Limited cricketers